Josemania pinnata, synonym Cipuropsis pinnata, is a species in the family Bromeliaceae, native to Panama, Colombia and Ecuador.

References

Tillandsioideae
Flora of Colombia
Flora of Ecuador
Flora of Panama